Shur Daraq-e Olya (also Romanized as Shūr Daraq-e ‘Olyā; also known as Shūr Daraq-e Bālā) is a village in Angut-e Sharqi Rural District, Anguti District, Germi County, Ardabil Province, Iran. At the 2006 census, its population was 84, in 22 families.

References 

Towns and villages in Germi County